The table below provides a schematic and hierarchic overview of the institutions of the Belgian federated state, according to the  principle of the Trias Politica (the theoretical concept of the Separation of political powers) in law-making, executive and judicial powers (the horizontal separation of powers) and according to their territorial level or so called subsidiarity (the vertical separation of powers).

(*) a part of the executive responsibilities in Brussels are executed by the Flemish Community council (for Brussels) (VGC). This is not a government but a subsidiary executive organ.

References

External links
Belgian Government Portal